Locust Grove, also known as the Haldeman Mansion, is a historic home located at Conoy Township in Lancaster County, Pennsylvania. It was built about 1782, and is a large, two-story, four-bay by two-bay stone dwelling overlooking the Susquehanna River.  It has a massive central chimney  Also on the property is a rectangular, two-story stone building with a hipped gable roof.

It was listed on the National Register of Historic Places in 1977.

References 

Houses on the National Register of Historic Places in Pennsylvania
Houses completed in 1782
Houses in Lancaster County, Pennsylvania
National Register of Historic Places in Lancaster County, Pennsylvania
1782 establishments in Pennsylvania